Ricky D. Long is an American politician from Maine. A Republican, Long formerly represented a portion of Aroostook County, Maine, in the Maine House of Representatives. He was first elected to the legislature in 2010 after serving as chair of the board of selectmen in his hometown of Sherman, Maine. During the 126th Legislature (2013–14), Long submitted a bill to ban the Agenda 21 environmental action plan in Maine. He also co-sponsored a bill with Senator Roger Sherman (R-Houlton) to allow the town of Bancroft, Maine, to become an unorganized territory.

References

Year of birth missing (living people)
Living people
People from Aroostook County, Maine
Republican Party members of the Maine House of Representatives
21st-century American politicians